The Texas Association of Licensed Investigators (TALI) is a professional association of private investigators in the U.S. state of Texas. It ensures adherence to licensing requirements for investigators; organizes training and education; and represents the profession to the state and federal government and regulatory bodies, including the Texas Private Security Board and the Texas Department of Public Safety. TALI holds an annual convention and publishes a magazine, The Texas Investigator.

TALI was founded in 1971. During the 1990s, it lobbied repeatedly to retain access to drivers’ license and vehicle registration information. In the 2000s, it intervened to amend regulation of workers who access computer data. Since 2008, TALI has set up local chapters in each city and major rural area of the state, reporting to five regional directors.

Founding
Prior to State of Texas licensing, a governing board and a state law, the licensing and regulation of the profession was a mixed bag of local licensing by a few municipal and county governments. Because of the lack of consistent regulation among counties and cities, a group of five investigators met to discuss their ideas for the future. Their teamwork led to growth in the membership and resulted in the Texas Legislature passing Article 4413(29bb) V.A.C.S. in 1969. This act established the Texas Board of Private Investigators, private security agencies, and the accompanying state regulatory agency.

However, one member hijacked the association for his own purposes. The effect was to sow dissent instead of camaraderie and to stall the forward momentum of the group. The budding association wound up going to court to preserve its name.

In 1973, David Sallee, Ernest Humberson, Don Redding, and Ron Kelly revived the nearly lifeless association. These men knew that a statewide organization working for the good of all investigators could help all Texas investigators improve their professional image with the public.

The founding investigators developed the first code of ethics and a set of by-laws for the association. The by-laws established a board of directors consisting of five positions: chairman, president, vice-president, secretary, and treasurer.

In the early 1970s, TALI held its first annual meeting in Longview, Texas. By then there were twenty-five members.  TALI’s annual conventions have since grown in attendance to 650 investigators and other legal professionals. These meetings now offer investigative education, training, vendor product displays, and networking opportunities, which have begun to attract investigators from other states.

History

1980s and 1990s
In the late 1980s and early 1990s, TALI’s membership grew rapidly. The association became active in education, legislation, training, and working with the state legislature and regulatory agency. By 1991, TALI began developing more political strategies to better serve the profession and its needs.

In 1991, the members lobbied the Texas Legislature and testified before House and Senate Committees to defeat two bills that would have eliminated access to drivers’ license and vehicle registration information. TALI's leadership appointed a magazine editor and produced an improved quarterly publication for Texas investigators.

In 1993, bills were again introduced in the legislature to deny investigators access to driver's license and vehicle registration. TALI members appeared before House and Senate Committees to testify against these bills, with success. The same year, an anti-stalking bill was introduced that would have eliminated Texas investigators' abilities to perform routine surveillances. TALI met with sponsors of the bill and were able to get it changed so that investigators could continue to perform surveillance.

In 1995, TALI joined a state representative to sponsor an overhaul of Article 4413 (29bb) V.A.C.S. TALI held its first legislative walk-through day with 100 members present. The legislative efforts resulted in the mandating of continuing education, increase in penalties for unlicensed companies from a class A misdemeanor to a 3rd degree felony for a second offense, and established a definition of a full-time peace officer in Texas. TALI representatives helped in writing the present Texas law governing the use of tracking devices and getting it passed into law. TALI hired its first paid magazine editor and published the first edition of The Texas Investigator.

In 1996, TALI became involved in federal legislation, along with the National Council of Investigation and Security Services (NCISS). The joint venture resulted in the first federal law recognizing the private investigative profession: the Drivers Privacy Protection Act. The act also allowed state licensed private investigators access to vehicle registration information. The Texas Sunset Commission began hearings to review the Texas Board of Private Investigators and Private Security Agency. TALI worked with the commission and testified before hearings regarding the restructure and naming of the agency.

In 1997, TALI again worked in the Texas Legislature to keep public records open to the public. It was successful in getting the Drivers Privacy Protection Act] passed, which allowed state of Texas private investigators access to drivers license and vehicle registration information.

In 1998 and 1999, TALI was again at the forefront in working for open records on both the national and state levels. In the 1999 session the Texas Legislature renamed the Texas Board of Private Investigators and Private Security Agencies to the Texas Commission on Private Security.

2000 to present
In 2001, TALI and its members appeared before the Texas Legislative Committees, fighting for Texas Open Records and the continuing survival of the regulatory agency. In this session the legislature moved the Private Security Board employees and budget under the control of the Texas Department of Public Safety for oversight. The number of employees were reduced to eight, including the executive director. The Private Security Board remained freestanding and separate from the Department of Public Safety.

By 2003, TALI initiatives with the Texas legislature had resulted in the establishment of the Private Security Bureau within the Texas Department of Public Safety. Approximately 28 state troopers and supervisors were assigned to the Private Security Bureau under the direction of a DPS captain. Their primary function was to enforce Article 1702 of the Occupations Code and the rules established by the Private Security Board.

In 2005, TALI assisted with the Texas Department of Public Safety’s request for additional funding for the Private Security Bureau. By a vote of the membership, the TALI board of directors was increased to include the formerly appointed regional directors. There was a major re-write of the by-laws that resulted in new leadership joining the board of directors.

In 2006, TALI joined with representatives of DPS, the Private Security Board, and security, alarm, and locksmith associations to prepare for the 2007 legislative session. In a joint effort, HB 2833 was passed by the legislature. TALI members were instrumental in the development and passage of this initiative. The act covered many areas, including strengthening Article 1702 of the Occupations Code, and set the groundwork for future joint efforts of the professions regulated by the Private Security Board and The Texas Department of Public Safety, Private Security Bureau. Section 1702.104 of the bill was controversial in that it began requiring any person or company performing computer forensic investigations, data collections, analysis of computer-based data, or computer repairs to become a licensed Private Investigator, a requirement made based on the advice of the Private Investigator industry and without consultation of the computer forensic/investigations industry - fields which have extremely different skill sets. The law was later amended to exempt those people performing computer repairs from the PI license requirement.

In 2006, the TALI magazine became a full color glossy professional journal entitled The Texas Investigator. 2006 saw TALI produce the first Southwest Super Conference (SWSC). Investigators attended the conference from New England, Colorado, Louisiana, and other states.

In 2008, the TALI board redesigned the organization by creating local chapters in each city and major rural area of the state. The local chapters reported to five regional directors. This infrastructure allowed the individual members in each area to have a local representative who was familiar with local issues to represent them at the regional level. The regional directors, who previously had been mere figureheads, became more involved managers of their districts. For the first time, the regional directors could relay grassroots concerns to the board at quarterly meetings, thereby acting as liaisons between investigators and board members.

References

External links
 

Professional associations based in the United States